The Ministry of Safety and Security was a department of the Namibian government, responsible for overseeing the operations of the Namibian police and the correctional services.

History
At independence of Namibia there was no dedicated ministry for the security portfolio but a Minister of State, a position occupied by Peter Tsheehama, the head of the Namibia Central Intelligence Service, until 2005. In 1995 the Ministry of Prisons and Correctional Services was established. Its minister was Marco Hausiku.

The ministry was renamed Ministry of Safety and Security in 2005, and existed until 2020 when its portfolio was added to the interior ministry, forming the Ministry of Home Affairs, Immigration, Safety and Security (MHAISS). The  minister of Home Affairs, Immigration, Safety and Security is Albert Kawana.

Ministers
All security ministers in chronological order are:

References

Safety and security
Crime in Namibia
Law enforcement in Namibia
1995 establishments in Namibia
2020 disestablishments in Namibia